Phoenix Metro may refer to:

Phoenix metropolitan area, the metropolitan area surrounding and including Phoenix, Arizona
Valley Metro, the public transit system serving Phoenix, Arizona
Valley Metro Rail, the light rail system operated by Valley Metro